Konstantine Janashia (born 30 August 1990) is a pro-strongman from Georgia. In 2016, Janashia became the first Georgian to reach the World's Strongest Man final, where he placed fourth.

Career
Janashia started his sporting career in rugby and was part of the local junior team. He started weightlifting at the age of 18 and would soon receive an invite to his first strongman contest from his national federation after noticing his size and strength.

In August 2016, Janashia made his first appearance at the World's Strongest Man competition. He made it past the qualifying heats to the finals and placed fourth overall in the competition.

In April 2017, Janashia made his first appearance at Europe's Strongest Man, where he placed fourth. In May 2017, he returned to the World's Strongest Man competition, made it to the finals and placed eighth overall. In September 2017, he took part in the World Deadlift Championships as part of the Giants Live Tour Final. He pulled  for 5 reps, with JF Caron matching him. He would go on to place second overall in the Tour Final.

In April 2018, Janashia returned to Europe's Strongest Man and placed second behind Hafthor Bjornsson. Later that month, he competed at the 2018 World's Strongest Man competition and placed ninth overall.

In April 2019, Janashia competed at the 2019 Europe's Strongest Man competition and set a new Georgian Record in the Log Lift, lifting . He placed third in the overall competition. In June 2019, he competed at the 2019 World's Strongest Man competition and made it to the finals. However, he had to withdraw due to a tricep tear, settling for tenth place.

However, Janashia only managed to pull 2 reps while Heinla broke the record by pulling 6 reps. In November 2020, Janashia was unable to compete at the 2020 World's Strongest Man competition due to testing positive for COVID-19.

Personal records
Done in official strongman competition:
 Deadlift (with straps and suit) –  for 5 reps (2017 World Deadlift Championships)
 Deadlift (with straps and suit) –  for One Rep Max (2017 World's Strongest Man)
 Log Lift –  (2019 Europe's Strongest Man)
 Keg Toss –  (2021 World's Strongest Man)
 18-Inch Deadlift (with straps and suit) –  (2018 World's Ultimate Strongman)
 Hummer Tire Deadlift (with straps and suit) –  (2021 Shaw Classic)
 Axle Press –  (2017 Europe's Strongest Man)

See also
 List of strongmen

References

1990 births
Living people
Male athletes from Georgia (country)